John E. Redwine (June 6, 1823 - ?) was a farmer, lawyer, newspaper editor, clerk, and state legislator for Hall County, Georgia. He lived in Gainesville, Georgia. He was born in North Carolina. 

He was born in Randolph County, North Carolina. He served in the Georgia House of Representatives in 1878. He was elected again and served in 1882 and 1883. He published the Gainesville Eagle.

He married and had seven children. Lyman A. Redwine was one of his children.

References

Members of the Georgia House of Representatives
Farmers from Georgia (U.S. state)
19th-century American newspaper editors
1823 births
Editors of Georgia (U.S. state) newspapers
Year of death missing
People from Gainesville, Georgia
People from Randolph County, North Carolina
Georgia (U.S. state) lawyers
19th-century American lawyers
19th-century American politicians